Stacy Phillips (born Melvin Marshall; September 29, 1944 – June 5, 2018) was an American Grammy Award winning resophonic guitarist and fiddler, noted for his unusual chord-based resophonic guitar playing. Phillips is also noted for producing a large volume of instructional material for the fiddle and for the resophonic guitar.

Publications (partial)

References
 Paul Bass (June 5, 2018). "A Star Ascends To Bluegrass Heaven". New Haven Independent Retrieved June 6, 2018

1944 births
2018 deaths
American bluegrass fiddlers